The  Ministry of Culture  is an agency of the government of Bashkortostan, headquartered in Feck building, Ufa.  Until 2010, he was the Ministry of Culture and National Policy.

Mission
The Republic of Bashkortostan Ministry of Culture  is working to strengthen the Culture. It also supervises the work of lower establishments, for example Bashkir Nesterov Art Museum, Hudayberdin museum.

Ministers 
After the 2012 Head of the Ministry of Culture has been Amina Shafikova.

References

External links
 Republic of Bashkortostan Ministry of Culture Official Website in Russian

Politics of Bashkortostan
Government ministries of Bashkortostan
Bashkortostan